Helen Hill Historic District is a national historic district located at Saranac Lake, Essex County and Franklin County, New York.  It encompasses 77 contributing buildings and 38 contributing structures in a predominantly residential section of Saranac Lake.  It developed between about 1856 and 1954, and includes notable examples of Queen Anne, Colonial Revival, Tudor Revival, and Bungalow / American Craftsman style architecture. The district is characterized by many cottages retaining the "cure porches" that distinguished the area's early days as a sanitarium. Located in the district are the separately listed Bogie Cottage, Coulter Cottage, Fallon Cottage Annex, Hill Cottage, Hooey Cottage, Kennedy Cottage, Lent Cottage, Marvin Cottage, and Noyes Cottage. Other notable buildings include the Cure Cottage Museum (c. 1923) and Mary Prescott Reception Hospital (c. 1905).

It was added to the National Register of Historic Places in 2015.

References

External links 

 Historic Saranac Lake: Helen Hill Historic District

Historic districts on the National Register of Historic Places in New York (state)
Queen Anne architecture in New York (state)
Tudor Revival architecture in New York (state)
Colonial Revival architecture in New York (state)
Buildings and structures in Franklin County, New York
Buildings and structures in Essex County, New York
National Register of Historic Places in Essex County, New York